28 Vulpeculae is a single star in the northern constellation of Vulpecula. It lies approximately 560 light years away and is visible to the naked eye as a faint, blue-white hued star with an apparent visual magnitude of 5.047.

This is a subgiant star with a spectral class of B5 IV, indicating a hot massive star that has started to evolve away from the main sequence after exhausting it core hydrogen. It has been included in a list of the least variable stars observed with the Hipparcos satellite; its brightness varied by no more than 0.0005 magnitudes in the Hipparcos passband. The star has five times the mass of the Sun and is spinning rapidly with a projected rotational velocity of 285 km/s. It is radiating 713 times the Sun's luminosity from its photosphere at an effective temperature of 15,200 K.

References

B-type subgiants
Vulpecula
Durchmusterung objects
Vulpeculae, 28
196740
101868
7894